Ruslan Shafikov (born May 11, 1976) is a Russian former professional ice hockey player who played in the Russian Superleague (RSL). Shafikov was drafted in the eighth round of the 1995 NHL Entry Draft by the Philadelphia Flyers, but he never played professionally in North America. He played seven seasons in the RSL for Salavat Yulaev Ufa and SKA Saint Petersburg.

Career statistics

References

External links

1976 births
Living people
Philadelphia Flyers draft picks
Russian ice hockey centres
Salavat Yulaev Ufa players
SKA Saint Petersburg players
Sportspeople from Ufa